The Birthday Boys is a novel by Beryl Bainbridge. First published in 1991, this book tells the story of Captain Robert Scott's 1910-13 expedition to Antarctica.

Plot introduction
Five first-person narratives give different perspectives on the voyage: Petty Officer Taff Evans; the ship's scholar, medic, and biologist Dr. Edward Wilson; Robert Falcon Scott; Lieutenant Henry Bowers; and Captain Lawrence Oates each give their account of the hardships, the problems, and finally the failure of their endeavour: Norwegian explorer Roald Amundsen beats them to the South Pole by a month.

Major themes
Beryl Bainbridge's book unites many features which have come to be seen as typical of Postmodernism: The five tales differ greatly and it is clear that readers are expected to make up their own minds as to the extent of "truth" in historical accounts of the events.

Post-modernist literature often tries to subvert the assumption that there is a definite distinction between the imagined and the real. Traditionally, historiography is concerned with the domain of "truth" and "reality" and literature, on the other hand, deals with the "imaginative". The Birthday Boys blurs the borders between "fact" and "fiction".

1991 British novels
Historical novels
Novels by Beryl Bainbridge
Fiction with unreliable narrators
Novels set in Antarctica
Heroic Age of Antarctic Exploration
Gerald Duckworth and Company books
Robert Falcon Scott
Fiction set in the 1910s